Anicequol (developmental code names NGA0187, NGD-187) is a naturally occurring ergostane or lanostane steroid produced by Acremonium sp. TF-0356 which has nerve growth factor-like neurotrophic activity. It was under investigation by Taisho Pharmaceutical in Japan for the treatment of cognitive disorders in the 1990s, but development was discontinued and the drug was never marketed.

Chemistry

See also
 BNN-20
 BNN-27
 Sarsasapogenin

References

External links
 NGD-187 - AdisInsight

Acetate esters
Polyols
Ergostanes
Neurosteroids
Abandoned drugs
Sterols